North Vancouver-Capilano was a provincial electoral district in the Canadian province of British Columbia from 1966 to 1991. The riding's predecessor  was North Vancouver, which first appeared on the hustings from 1903.

For other historical and current ridings in Vancouver or the North Shore see Vancouver (electoral districts).  For other Greater Vancouver area ridings please see New Westminster (electoral districts).

Demographics

Political geography

Notable elections

Notable MLAs

Electoral history 

 
|Liberal
|Ray Perrault
|align="right"|6,426 	 	
|align="right"|51.49%
|align="right"|
|align="right"|unknown

 
|Progressive Conservative
|Donald Clarke Paterson
|align="right"|261 	
|align="right"|2.09%
|align="right"|
|align="right"|unknown
|- bgcolor="white"
!align="right" colspan=3|Total valid votes
!align="right"|12,479	
!align="right"|100.00%
!align="right"|
|- bgcolor="white"
!align="right" colspan=3|Total rejected ballots
!align="right"|96
!align="right"|
!align="right"|
|- bgcolor="white"
!align="right" colspan=3|Turnout
!align="right"|%
!align="right"|
!align="right"|
|}

 
|Liberal
|David Maurice Brousson
|align="right"|5,578 		 	
|align="right"|53.61%
|align="right"|
|align="right"|unknown

 
|New Democrat
|Sidney Bernard Simons
|align="right"|1,265 	 	
|align="right"|12.16%
|align="right"|
|align="right"|unknown
 
|Progressive Conservative
|Charles Rankin Maclean
|align="right"|435 	
|align="right"|4.18%
|align="right"|
|align="right"|unknown

|- bgcolor="white"
!align="right" colspan=3|Total valid votes
!align="right"|10,404 	
!align="right"|100.00%
!align="right"|
|- bgcolor="white"
!align="right" colspan=3|Total rejected ballots
!align="right"|55
!align="right"|
!align="right"|
|- bgcolor="white"
!align="right" colspan=3|Turnout
!align="right"|%
!align="right"|
!align="right"|
|}
Reason for by-election: Resignation of R. J. Perrault on June 5, 1968 to contest federal election (Burnaby-Seymour, June 25, 1968).

 
|Liberal
|David Maurice Brousson
|align="right"|7,175 		 	
|align="right"|48.32%
|align="right"|
|align="right"|unknown

 
|New Democrat
|Allan Jarvis Duplissie
|align="right"|2,591 	 	
|align="right"|17.45%
|align="right"|
|align="right"|unknown
|- bgcolor="white"
!align="right" colspan=3|Total valid votes
!align="right"|14,850 	
!align="right"|100.00%
!align="right"|
|- bgcolor="white"
!align="right" colspan=3|Total rejected ballots
!align="right"|93
!align="right"|
!align="right"|
|- bgcolor="white"
!align="right" colspan=3|Turnout
!align="right"|%
!align="right"|
!align="right"|
|}

 
|Liberal
|David Maurice Brousson
|align="right"|6,851 	 	
|align="right"|39.54%
|align="right"|
|align="right"|unknown

 
|Progressive Conservative
|Jacob Brouwer
|align="right"|3,526 			
|align="right"|20.35%
|align="right"|
|align="right"|unknown

|- bgcolor="white"
!align="right" colspan=3|Total valid votes
!align="right"|17,328 	
!align="right"|100.00%
!align="right"|
|- bgcolor="white"
!align="right" colspan=3|Total rejected ballots
!align="right"|123
!align="right"|
!align="right"|
|- bgcolor="white"
!align="right" colspan=3|Turnout
!align="right"|%
!align="right"|
!align="right"|
|}

 
|Liberal
|Gordon Fulerton Gibson
|align="right"|4,736 	 	 	 	
|align="right"|31.11%
|align="right"|
|align="right"|unknown

  
|Progressive Conservative
|Peter Stewart Hyndman
|align="right"|3,151 			
|align="right"|20.70%
|align="right"|
|align="right"|unknown

|- bgcolor="white"
!align="right" colspan=3|Total valid votes
!align="right"|15,222 	 	
!align="right"|100.00%
!align="right"|
|- bgcolor="white"
!align="right" colspan=3|Total rejected ballots
!align="right"|84
!align="right"|
!align="right"|
|- bgcolor="white"
!align="right" colspan=3|Turnout
!align="right"|%
!align="right"|
!align="right"|
|}
Reason for by-election: Resignation of D. M. Brousson on October 23, 1973 to look after his business interests.

 
|Liberal
|Gordon Fulerton Gibson
|align="right"|8,836 	 	 	 	
|align="right"|44.74%
|align="right"|
|align="right"|unknown

|- bgcolor="white"
!align="right" colspan=3|Total valid votes
!align="right"|19,749 	 	
!align="right"|100.00%
!align="right"|
|- bgcolor="white"
!align="right" colspan=3|Total rejected ballots
!align="right"|230
!align="right"|
!align="right"|
|- bgcolor="white"
!align="right" colspan=3|Turnout
!align="right"|%
!align="right"|
!align="right"|
|}
  	  	 	  	 

 
|Liberal
|Frank Carlton Warburton  	
|align="right"|1,805 	 	
|align="right"|7.59%
|align="right"|
|align="right"|unknown
 
|Progressive Conservative
|William James Nichol
|align="right"|1,579 			
|align="right"|6.65%
|align="right"|
|align="right"|unknown
|- bgcolor="white"
!align="right" colspan=3|Total valid votes
!align="right"|23,770 	 	
!align="right"|100.00%
!align="right"|
|- bgcolor="white"
!align="right" colspan=3|Total rejected ballots
!align="right"|455
!align="right"|
!align="right"|
|- bgcolor="white"
!align="right" colspan=3|Turnout
!align="right"|%
!align="right"|
!align="right"|
|}
  	  	   	 	

 
|Liberal
|L. Jean Driscoll-Bell
|align="right"|1,424 	 		 	
|align="right"|5.43%
|align="right"|
|align="right"|unknown
|- bgcolor="white"
!align="right" colspan=3|Total valid votes
!align="right"|26,211 			 
!align="right"|100.00%
!align="right"|
|- bgcolor="white"
!align="right" colspan=3|Total rejected ballots
!align="right"|241
!align="right"|
!align="right"|
|- bgcolor="white"
!align="right" colspan=3|Turnout
!align="right"|%
!align="right"|
!align="right"|
|}

 
|Liberal
|Mike Edward Downing
|align="right"|3,022 		 	
|align="right"|11.92%
|align="right"|
|align="right"|unknown

|- bgcolor="white"
!align="right" colspan=3|Total valid votes
!align="right"| 25,358 	
!align="right"|100.00%
!align="right"|
|- bgcolor="white"
!align="right" colspan=3|Total rejected ballots
!align="right"|388
!align="right"|
!align="right"|
|- bgcolor="white"
!align="right" colspan=3|Turnout
!align="right"|%
!align="right"|
!align="right"|
|}

External links 
Elections BC Historical Returns

Former provincial electoral districts of British Columbia
North Vancouver (district municipality)